University of Singaperbangsa Karawang is the first university to be established in Karawang. It was established on 2 February 1982.
The university is named Raden Adipati Singaperbangsa, founder of Karawang under Sultan Agung of Mataram. On October 6, 2014 UNSIKA became a public university.

Faculties 

 Faculty of Law
 Faculty of Economics and Business
 Faculty of Teacher Training and Education
 Faculty of Agriculture
 Faculty of Islamic Studie
 Faculty of Engineering
 Faculty of Computer Science
 Faculty of Social Science and Political Science
 Faculty of Health Science

External links
 www.unsika.ac.id

Universities in Indonesia
Universities in West Java
Indonesian state universities